Sailor Izzy Murphy is a 1927 comedy-drama film released from Warner Bros. Pictures starring George Jessel, Audrey Ferris, Warner Oland and John Milijan. The film was a follow up to a previous film starring Jessel titled Private Izzy Murphy. The premiere was set for October 8, 1927, at Warners' Theater, two days after the premiere of The Jazz Singer, the first talking film (Part-talkie) starring Al Jolson.

Sailor Izzy Murphy was filmed as a silent film, but was also released with a Vitaphone music soundtrack, with music and sound effects recorded on transcription disks which was synchronized with the film, but with no spoken dialogue.

Plot
Izzy, a perfume vendor, is urged by Jake, his partner, to sell Monsieur Jules, a millionaire perfume merchant, their special formula, but the merchant is incensed to see his daughter's picture on Izzy's perfume bottles and gives him the bum's rush. Aboard Jules's palatial yacht, he receives from Orchid Joe notes threatening his life. Joe is a lunatic who hates people who destroy flowers, and he plans to kill Jules with the help of a crew of maniacs on the yacht. Izzy gets aboard by announcing himself as "Muscle-Bound Murphy," along with Jake, and they promise to help the millionaire and his daughter, Marie. When Izzy is assigned to kill Jules, he feigns great joy and induces Jake to stand in for the assassination, but they are captured by the crew. Through his cleverness, Izzy outsmarts the maniacs and attracts a rescue party, thus closing the sale and winning the love of Marie.

Cast
George Jessel as Izzy Goldberg
Audrey Ferris as Marie
Warner Oland as Monsieur Jules de Gondelaurier
John Miljan as Orchid Joe
Otto Lederer as Jake
Theodore Lorch as the first mate
Clara Horton as Cecile

See also
List of early Warner Bros. sound and talking features

Preservation status
No known film element, including the Vitaphone Sound-on-disc soundtrack, is known to exist, meaning it is currently a lost film.

References

External links
 
 

1927 films
1920s English-language films
American silent feature films
Warner Bros. films
1927 comedy-drama films
American black-and-white films
Lost American films
1927 lost films
1920s American films
Lost comedy-drama films
Silent American comedy-drama films